Palaquium rostratum is a tree in the family Sapotaceae. The specific epithet rostratum means "beaked", likely referring to the fruit.

Description
The bark is greyish brown. Inflorescences bear up to two brownish tomentose flowers. The timber is used for furniture-making.

Distribution and habitat
Palaquium rostratum is native to Thailand and Malesia. Its habitat is mixed dipterocarp and kerangas forests from sea level to  altitude.

References

rostratum
Trees of Thailand
Trees of Malesia
Plants described in 1861
Taxa named by William Burck